The 2007 Internationaux de Nouvelle-Calédonie was a professional tennis tournament played on hard courts. It was the fourth edition of the tournament which was part of the 2007 ATP Challenger Series. It took place in Nouméa, New Caledonia between 2–7 January 2007.

Singles main-draw entrants

Seeds

 1 Rankings are as of 25 December 2006.

Other entrants
The following players received wildcards into the singles main draw:
  Jérémy Chardy
  Sébastien de Chaunac
  Édouard Roger-Vasselin
  Alexandre Sidorenko

The following players received entry from the qualifying draw:
  Nicholas Monroe
  Scott Oudsema
  Laurent Recouderc
  Pavel Šnobel

The following player received entry as a lucky loser:
  Benjamin Balleret

Champions

Singles

 Michael Russell def.  David Guez 6–0, 6–1.

Doubles

 Alex Kuznetsov /  Phillip Simmonds def.  Thierry Ascione /  Édouard Roger-Vasselin 7–6(7–5), 6–3.

External links
Official Website

2007 ATP Challenger Series
2007
2007 in New Caledonian sport
2007 in French tennis